Anthony Lee Barnette (born November 9, 1983) is an American former professional baseball pitcher. He played in Major League Baseball (MLB) for the Texas Rangers and Chicago Cubs and in Nippon Professional Baseball (NPB) for the Tokyo Yakult Swallows.

Career
Barnette is from Federal Way, Washington and attended Thomas Jefferson High School.  He attended Arizona State University, where he pitched for the Sun Devils.

Arizona Diamondbacks
Barnette was drafted by the Arizona Diamondbacks in the 10th round of the 2006 Major League Baseball Draft. The two sides agreed to a deal on June 8, 2006. He played in the Diamondbacks' organization through 2009. He was released on January 5, 2010.

Tokyo Yakult Swallows

Barnette signed with the Yakult Swallows of Nippon Professional Baseball prior to the 2010 season.

At the conclusion of the 2015 NPB season, his sixth with the Yakult Swallows, Barnette had appeared in 260 career games as a relief pitcher, compiling an 11–19 record and 97 saves with a 3.58 ERA and a 1.26 WHIP.  His 2015 season, in which the Swallows won the Central League, was his most successful by several measures. Barnette tied for first in the Central League in saves (41) and recorded the lowest ERA among closers (1.29, a career best).  He allowed just one home run in 62.2 innings and set a career-low WHIP of 0.89.

Texas Rangers
Barnette signed a two-year deal with the Texas Rangers of Major League Baseball on December 15, 2015. He made his major league debut against the Seattle Mariners on April 5, 2016. He allowed two runs on 3 hits while getting his first career MLB strikeout in two-thirds of an inning pitched. He finished the season with an ERA of 2.09, appearing in 53 games. He recorded 7 wins and 3 losses in  innings. The following season, his ERA fell to 5.49 in  innings. The Rangers declined Barnette's 2018 option on November 6, 2017, making him a free agent. He was re-signed by the team days later. On July 4, 2018, he was placed on the disabled list. Barnette became a free agent following the conclusion of the season.

Chicago Cubs
On February 1, 2019, Barnette signed a one-year major league contract with the Chicago Cubs. He opened the 2019 season on the injured list while dealing with right shoulder tightness. He rehabbed with the Iowa Cubs before being activated off the disabled list on June 23. On June 27, 2019, he was optioned down from the MLB Chicago Cubs, to the Triple AAA Iowa Cubs for Craig Kimbrel

Barnette announced his retirement on January 28, 2020. Barnette is currently in baseball operations and pro scouting for the Tokyo Yakult Swallows.

References

External links

1983 births
Living people
People from Federal Way, Washington
Sportspeople from Anchorage, Alaska
Baseball players from Alaska
Baseball players from Washington (state)
American expatriate baseball players in Japan
Nippon Professional Baseball pitchers
Major League Baseball pitchers
Tokyo Yakult Swallows players
Texas Rangers players
Chicago Cubs players
Arizona State Sun Devils baseball players
Missoula Osprey players
South Bend Silver Hawks players
Mobile BayBears players
Reno Aces players
Iowa Cubs players